The Hiroshima to Honolulu Friendship Torii is a half-size replica of the torii at Itsukushima Shrine  (Japanese: 厳島神社 Itsukushima-jinja) located in the Mōʻiliʻili Triangle Park of Honolulu, Hawaii. The replica torii was presented as a gift from Honolulu's sister-city, Hiroshima, where the original torii is located. Although intended as an offering of friendship, this torii caused controversy for using state funds to pay for a religious monument.

Plaques

There are two plaques on opposing sides of the gate; one describes the impetus for creating the replica and the other gives recognition for those involved in erecting the torii.

The first plaque describes the inception behind the torii:

Controversy
Although the torii itself was a gift from Hiroshima, the city of Honolulu spent $165,000 in order to erect the torii. This caused controversy because the torii is a religious monument of Shintoism, and spending state-allocated funds on a religious monument is a violation of the separation of church and state. Concerned citizens have expressed the replica torii's unavoidable religious aspects, however both the city of Honolulu and Hiroshima agree the gift is intended to be cultural and not religious.

References

Buildings and structures in Honolulu
2001 establishments in Hawaii